Nažbilj (Cyrillic: Нажбиљ) is a village in the municipality of Kakanj, Bosnia and Herzegovina.

Demographics 
According to the 2013 census, its population was 176.

References

Populated places in Kakanj